FUMC may refer to:
First United Methodist Church (disambiguation), various United Methodist congregations
Foundation University Medical College, a medical school in Pakistan